The 1951–52 season was the 72nd season of competitive football by Rangers.

Overview
Rangers played a total of 45 competitive matches during the 1951–52 season.

Results
All results are written with Rangers' score first.

Scottish League Division A

Scottish Cup

League Cup

St Mungo Cup

Appearances

See also
 1951–52 in Scottish football
 1951–52 Scottish Cup
 1951–52 Scottish League Cup

References 

Rangers F.C. seasons
Rangers